ISRIC - World Soil Information, legally known as International Soil Reference and Information Centre, is an independent science-based foundation. The institute was founded in 1966 following a recommendation of the International Society of Soil Science (ISSS, now International Union of Soil Sciences| (IUSS)) and the United Nations Educational, Scientific and Cultural Organization (UNESCO). It has a mission to serve the international community with information about the world’s soil resources to help address major global issues. 

ISRIC produces, gathers, compiles, and serves soil information at global, national, and regional levels with partners. Work is organized according to four work streams: Setting Standards and References, Soil Information Provisioning, Capacity Building and Advocacy, and Derived products. Reference collection includes country documentation (reports, maps and slides) and soil specimens (monoliths, samples, thin sections, hand specimens). Physical examples of the soil monolith collection are on permanent display in the World Soil Museum. ISRIC is a member of the ISC World Data System, also known as the WDC-Soils.

External links
 ISRIC World Soil Information website 
 WDC-Soils (World Data Centre for Soils) 
 Search and download ISRIC data sets
  Search/download data via WoSIS and SoilGrids portal

References

Earth sciences organizations
International scientific organizations
Soil and crop science organizations
Geographical databases
Geographic information systems organizations
Land management
Museums in the Netherlands
Pedology
Scientific organizations established in 1966
Museums established in 2014